Robert James Alvarez (born January 22, 1948) is an American animator, storyboard artist, television director, and writer. Alvarez studied at the Chouinard Art Institute, which later became the California Institute of the Arts, graduating in 1971. He began his career as an assistant animator for the 1968 film Yellow Submarine. Throughout his five decades in the animation industry, Alvarez has developed an extensive resume. He has worked on hundreds of productions, mainly for television. He is best known for his work on multiple shows at Hanna-Barbera and Cartoon Network Studios, and has also worked at other animation studios, such as Disney Television Animation, Nickelodeon, Frederator Studios, and Warner Bros. Animation. His studio credits include, in chronological order, Scooby-Doo, The Smurfs, The Jetsons, G.I. Joe, Teenage Mutant Ninja Turtles, DuckTales, SWAT Kats: The Radical Squadron, Animaniacs, Dexter's Laboratory, The Powerpuff Girls, Samurai Jack, Ben 10, Regular Show, and Adventure Time. He has been awarded six Primetime Emmy Awards and a total of 25 Emmy nominations for his achievements.

Career
Alvarez began his career as an assistant animator for the 1968 film Yellow Submarine starring The Beatles. Since then, he has worked on many animated television series, including Super Friends, The Smurfs, G.I. Joe: A Real American Hero, A Pup Named Scooby-Doo, SWAT Kats: The Radical Squadron, Dexter's Laboratory, I Am Weasel, The Grim Adventures of Billy & Mandy, The New Adventures of Winnie the Pooh and Regular Show. He also created and wrote two animated pilots, Pizza Boy in "No Tip" and Tumbleweed Tex in "School Daze", for Hanna-Barbera's cartoon shorts showcase What a Cartoon! in 1996.

Accolades
Alvarez has received 6 Primetime Emmy Awards, 9 Primetime Emmy Award nominations, and 1 Daytime Emmy Award nomination. His first nomination came in 1994 in the category Outstanding Animated Program (for Programming One Hour or Less) for directing The Town Santa Forgot. In 2000 and 2001, he received two more nominations for his work on The Powerpuff Girls, also receiving one in 2004 for The Powerpuff Girls special "'Twas the Fight Before Christmas". Alvarez won two Primetime Emmys for his work on the Genndy Tartakovsky series Star Wars: Clone Wars and a third for Samurai Jack. In 2006, he garnered one nomination for Foster's Home for Imaginary Friends and another for the My Life as a Teenage Robot special Escape from Cluster Prime. One more Foster's nomination followed in 2007 for the episode "Good Wilt Hunting" before he would win a Primetime Emmy for the show, which was for the special Destination: Imagination in 2009. In 2010, he was nominated for the animated short Uncle Grandpa in the category Outstanding Short-format Animated Program. Alvarez received a Primetime Emmy award for Regular Show in 2012, which he also was nominated for in 2011. His Daytime Emmy nomination was in 2007 for The Grim Adventures of Billy & Mandy in the category Outstanding Broadband Program — Children's.

Personal life
Alvarez attended Notre Dame High School in Sherman Oaks, California from 1962 to 1966. He has a Bachelor of Fine Arts degree in animation from the Chouinard Art Institute (now the California Institute of the Arts), which he completed in 1971.

Filmography

Television

Film

References

External links
 

Animators from Wisconsin
American male screenwriters
American storyboard artists
American television directors
American television producers
American animated film directors
American animated film producers
Hispanic and Latino American writers
California Institute of the Arts alumni
1948 births
Cartoon Network Studios people
Hanna-Barbera people
Living people
Primetime Emmy Award winners
Annie Award winners
Animation directors